Carroll County is a county located in the northern part of the U.S. state of Kentucky. Its county seat is Carrollton. The county was formed in 1838 and named for Charles Carroll of Carrollton, the last living signer of the Declaration of Independence. It is located at the confluence of the Kentucky and Ohio Rivers.

Geography
It is the third-smallest county by area in Kentucky.

Adjacent counties
 Jefferson County, Indiana  (north)
 Switzerland County, Indiana  (northwest)
 Gallatin County  (east)
 Owen County  (southeast)
 Henry County  (south)
 Trimble County  (west)

Demographics

As of the census of 2000, there were 10,155 people, 3,940 households, and 2,722 families residing in the county. The racial makeup of the county was 95.16% White, 1.94% Black or African American, 0.23% Native American, 0.17% Asian, 0.05% Pacific Islander, 1.42% from other races, and 1.04% from two or more races. 3.25% of the population were Hispanic or Latino of any race.

There were 3,940 households, out of which 33.10% had children under the age of 18 living with them, 52.40% were married couples living together, 11.70% had a female householder with no husband present, and 30.90% were non-families. 25.30% of all households were made up of individuals, and 10.10% had someone living alone who was 65 years of age or older. The average household size was 2.51 and the average family size was 2.98.

In the county, the population was spread out, with 25.30% under the age of 18, 9.10% from 18 to 24, 29.90% from 25 to 44, 23.20% from 45 to 64, and 12.50% who were 65 years of age or older. The median age was 36 years. For every 100 females there were 101.20 males. For every 100 females age 18 and over, there were 99.00 males.

The median income for a household in the county was $35,925, and the median income for a family was $44,037. Males had a median income of $33,588 versus $20,974 for females. The per capita income for the county was $17,057. About 10.40% of families and 14.90% of the population were below the poverty line, including 19.80% of those under age 18 and 21.60% of those age 65 or over

Communities
 Carrollton (county seat)
 English
 Ghent
 Prestonville
 Sanders
 Worthville

Politics
Carroll County was strongly pro-Confederate during the Civil War: only 2.70 percent of its white population volunteered to serve in the Union Army, which constitutes the fourteenth-lowest of 109 counties extant as of the 1860 election, and was indeed lower than for the whole of seceded Tennessee. Consequently, Carroll County remained overwhelmingly Democratic for the next century and a quarter, being the only Kentucky county outside the heavily unionized coalfields to vote for George McGovern in 1972. The first Republican to carry Carroll County was Ronald Reagan in 1984, and the growing social liberalism of the Democratic Party has meant the county has voted increasingly Republican since the turn of the century, although Hillary Clinton's 28.69 percent – even if over fifteen percent worse than any previous Democrat – was still as good as she received in any rural white southern county.

In gubernatorial elections, Carroll has remained solidly Democratic: no Republican gubernatorial candidate ever carried the county until 2019, when Carroll County voted for Matt Bevin.

See also

 National Register of Historic Places listings in Carroll County, Kentucky

References

External links
 Carroll County Chamber of Commerce website
 Carroll County Government Site

 
1838 establishments in Kentucky
Populated places established in 1838
Kentucky counties
Kentucky counties on the Ohio River